Reverend Oswald Staniforth (born George Edward Charles Staniforth; 1865–1930) was a British Franciscan friar notable for his writings on various religious subjects.

Biography
George was born in the town of Erith, Kent, to Charles Staniforth, an accountant who was born in Smyrna, Turkey as a British Subject, and Agnes Harrietta Woodbridge, born in France. By age fourteen he was attending St Augustine's College, Canterbury. He worked as a missionary during the Boer War, serving with the British Army in South Africa. He lived in various places over his life including Kent, Yorkshire, Wales and had worked as a missionary in California and Montreal.

Writings
 Sketch of St. Louis King of France
 Life of St. Francis 
 The Third Order of Saint Francis: Being three lectures delivered at the Franciscan summer school, Oxford, August 1928

References

1865 births
1930 deaths
20th-century English Roman Catholic priests
British expatriates in the United States
Roman Catholic missionaries in the United States
British Franciscans
British expatriates in South Africa
British expatriates in Canada